The 1985–86 WHL season was the 20th season for the Western Hockey League.  Fourteen teams completed a 72-game season.  The Kamloops Blazers won the President's Cup.

League notes
The Kelowna Wings relocated to Spokane, Washington to become the Spokane Chiefs.
The Seattle Breakers became the Seattle Thunderbirds.

Regular season

Final standings

Scoring leaders
Note: GP = Games played; G = Goals; A = Assists; Pts = Points; PIM = Penalties in minutes

1986 WHL Playoffs

First round
The East division played a round robin format amongst the top six teams:
Prince Albert (9–1) advanced
Medicine Hat (8–2) advanced
Saskatoon (7–3) advanced
Moose Jaw (4–6) advanced
Lethbridge (1–9) eliminated
Regina (1–9) eliminated

Division semi-finals
Medicine Hat defeated Moose Jaw 3 games to 0
Prince Albert defeated Saskatoon 3 games to 0
Kamloops defeated Seattle 5 games to 0
Portland defeated Spokane 5 games to 4

Division finals
Medicine Hat defeated Prince Albert 4 games to 3
Kamloops defeated Portland 5 games to 1

WHL Championship
Kamloops defeated Medicine Hat 4 games to 1

All-Star game

On January 20, the Portland Winter Hawks defeated the West All-Stars 4–3 in Portland, Oregon with a crowd of 3,106.

On January 21, the East All-Stars defeated the Prince Albert Raiders 6–3 in Prince Albert, Saskatchewan before a crowd of 1,475.

WHL awards
Note: In some cases, the WHL handed out separate awards for the East and West divisions.

All-Star Teams

See also
1986 Memorial Cup
1986 NHL Entry Draft
1985 in sports
1986 in sports

References
whl.ca
 2005–06 WHL Guide

Western Hockey League seasons
WHL
WHL